A wineskin is an ancient type of bottle made of leathered animal skin, usually from goats or sheep, used to store or transport wine.

History

Its first mentions come from Ancient Greece, where, in the parties called Bacchanalia, dedicated to the god Bacchus by the vintage of this drink, was offered the sacrifice of the goat, with which would be made the wineskin that would conserve the wine.

New Wine into Old Wineskins is a parable of Jesus.

See also
 Ancient Greece and wine
 Food history
 New Wine into Old Wineskins
 Bota bag
 Waterskin

References

History of wine
Wine packaging and storage
Bottles